Abū Muḥammad ʿAbd al-Malik ibn Hishām ibn Ayyūb al-Ḥimyarī al-Muʿāfirī al-Baṣrī (died 7 May 833), or Ibn Hisham, edited the biography of Islamic prophet Muhammad written by Ibn Ishaq. The nisba Al-Baṣrī means "of Basra", in modern Iraq.

Life 

Ibn Hisham has been said to have grown up in Basra and moved afterwards to Egypt. His family was native to Basra but he himself was born in Old Cairo. He gained a name as a grammarian and student of language and history in Egypt. His family was of Himyarite origin and belongs to Banu Ma‘afir tribe of Yemen.

Biography of Muḥammad 

As-Sīrah an-Nabawiyyah, 'The Life of the Prophet'; is an edited recension of Ibn Isḥāq's classic Sīratu Rasūli l-Lāh 'The Life of God's Messenger'. Ibn Isḥāq's now lost work survives only in Ibn Hishām's and al-Tabari's recensions, although fragments of several others survive, and Ibn Hishām and al-Tabarī share virtually the same material.

Ibn Hishām explains in the preface of the work, the criteria by which he made his choice from the original work of Ibn Isḥāq in the tradition of his disciple Ziyād al-Baqqāʾi (d. 799). Accordingly, Ibn Hishām omits stories from Al-Sīrah that contain no mention of Muḥammad, certain poems, traditions whose accuracy Ziyād al-Baqqāʾi  could not confirm, and offensive passages that could offend the reader. Al-Tabari includes controversial episodes of the Satanic Verses including an apocryphal story about Muḥammad's attempted suicide. Ibn Hishām gives more accurate versions of the poems he includes and supplies explanations of difficult terms and phrases of the Arabic language, additions of genealogical content to certain proper names, and brief descriptions of the places mentioned in Al-Sīrah. Ibn Hishām appends his notes to the corresponding passages of the original text with the words: "qāla Ibn Hishām" (Ibn Hishām says).

Translations and editions
Later Ibn Hishām's As-Sira would chiefly be transmitted by his pupil, Ibn al-Barqī.  This treatment of Ibn Ishāq's work was circulated to scholars in Cordoba in Islamic Spain by around 864. The first printed edition was published in Arabic by the German orientalist Ferdinand Wüstenfeld, in Göttingen (1858-1860).  The  Life of Moḥammad According to Moḥammed b. Ishāq, ed. 'Abd al-Malik b. Hisham. Gustav Weil (Stuttgart 1864) was the first published translation.

In the 20th century the book has been printed several times in the Middle East.  The German orientalist Gernot Rotter produced an abridged (about one third) German translation of The life of the Prophet. As-Sīra An-Nabawīya. (Spohr, Kandern in the Black Forest 1999).  An English translation by the British orientalist Alfred Guillaume: The Life of Muhammad. A translation of Ishaq's Sirat Rasul Allah. (1955); 11th edition. (Oxford University Press, Karachi 1996).

Other works 
Kitab al-Tijan li ma'rifati muluk al-zamān fi akhbar Qahtān 'The Book of Crowns, on the kings of yesteryear in the accounts of the Qahtān' (in Arabic); a genealogical work with historico-legendary accounts of the southern Arabs and their monuments in pre-Islamic times.

See also
 Prophetic biography
 List of biographies of Muhammad
 List of Islamic scholars

Notes

References

External links
 
 Biodata from Arees Institute
 The earliest biography of Muhammad, by ibn Ishaq in English
 Bibliography at Goodreads

Egyptian biographers
833 deaths
Year of birth unknown
Egyptian historians of Islam
9th-century historians from the Abbasid Caliphate
9th-century Arabs